This is a list of state prisons in South Carolina. It does not include federal prisons or county jails located in the state of South Carolina.

 Allendale Correctional Institution
 Broad River Correctional Institution
 Camille Griffin Graham Correctional Institution
 Evans Correctional Institution
 Goodman Correctional Institution (capacity 350)
 Kershaw Correctional Institution
 Kirkland Correctional Institution
 Leath Correctional Institution
 Lee Correctional Institution
 Lieber Correctional Institution
 Livesay Correctional Institution (capacity 530)
 MacDougall Correctional Institution (capacity 672)
 Manning Correctional Institution (capacity 919)
 McCormick Correctional Institution
 Palmer Pre-Release Center (capacity 292)
 Perry Correctional Institution (capacity 972)
 Ridgeland Correctional Institution
 Trenton Correctional Institution (capacity 719)
 Turbeville Correctional Institution
 Tyger River Correctional Institution
 Walden Correctional Institution (capacity 694)
 Wateree River Correctional Institution (capacity 884)

Closed 

 Campbell Pre-Release Center (closed 2014)
 Catawba Pre-Release Center (closed 2017)
 Coastal Pre-Release Center (closed 2015)
 Lower Savannah Pre-Release Center (closed 2016)
 South Carolina Penitentiary (demolished)
 Stevenson Correctional Institution (merged with Walden 2010)
 Watkins Pre-Release Center (closed 2012)

External links
South Carolina Department of Corrections

South Carolina

Prisons